Ugadi is a 1997 Telugu romantic film directed by S. V. Krishna Reddy starring himself and Laila in the lead roles.

This film is about a middle class young man winning his lady love despite opposition from the girl's father. The music for the film was well received.

Cast
 S. V. Krishna Reddy as Raju
 Laila
 Sharat Saxena
 Kaikala Satyanarayana
 Sudhakar
 Tanikella Bharani
 Mallikarjuna Rao
 Annapoorna
 Babu Mohan
 Gautam Raju
 Bandla Ganesh
 Sivaji Raja as Raju

Soundtrack

Reception 
The film was reviewed by Zamin Ryot. A critic from Andhra Today wrote that "The wishy- washy story and the lackluster performance of the hero disappoints the high expectations of the audience".

References

External links
 
 Ugadi film on Youtube

1997 films
Indian romance films
Films directed by S. V. Krishna Reddy
Films scored by S. V. Krishna Reddy
1990s Telugu-language films